Virginia Avenue District is a national historic district located at Indianapolis, Indiana.  The district encompasses 43 contributing buildings and 1 contributing structure in the Fountain Square Commercial Areas of Indianapolis. It developed between about 1871 and 1932, and notable buildings include the Sanders (Apex) Theater (1913), Southside Wagon and Carriage Works / Saffel Chair Company (1875, c. 1916), Fountain Square Theater (1928), Woessner Building (1876, 1915), Granada Theater (1928), Southside Theater (1911), Schreiber Block (1895), Fountain Square State Bank (1922), and Fountain Bank (1902).

It was listed on the National Register of Historic Places in 1983.

References

Historic districts on the National Register of Historic Places in Indiana
Commercial buildings on the National Register of Historic Places in Indiana
Historic districts in Indianapolis
National Register of Historic Places in Indianapolis
Fountain Square, Indianapolis